In the Hollow of Her Hand is a lost 1918 American silent mystery drama film directed by Charles Maigne and starring Alice Brady. It was produced and distributed by the Select Pictures Corporation.

Cast
Alice Brady as Hetty Castleton
Myrtle Stedman as Sara Wrandall
Louise Clark as Mrs. Wrandell
A.J. Herbert as Leslie Wrandell
Harold Entwistle as Mr. Wrandell Sr.
Percy Marmont as Brandon Booth

References

External links

1918 films
American silent feature films
Films directed by Charles Maigne
Lost American films
American black-and-white films
American mystery drama films
1910s mystery drama films
Selznick Pictures films
1918 lost films
Lost drama films
1918 drama films
1910s American films
Silent American drama films
Silent mystery films